Catoryctis is a genus of moths of the family Xyloryctidae.

Species
 Catoryctis eugramma Meyrick, 1890
 Catoryctis leucomerata (Lower, 1893)
 Catoryctis mediolinea Lucas, 1894
 Catoryctis nonolinea Lucas, 1894
 Catoryctis perichalca Lower, 1923
 Catoryctis polysticha Lower, 1893
 Catoryctis sciastis (Meyrick, 1915)
 Catoryctis subnexella (Walker, 1864)
 Catoryctis subparallela (Walker, 1864)
 Catoryctis tricrena Meyrick, 1890
 Catoryctis truncata Lucas, 1902

References

 
Xyloryctidae
Xyloryctidae genera